At the Royal Albert Hall is a 2022 live album recorded in 1970 with American swamp rock band Creedence Clearwater Revival. The performance was released as an album to coincide with the documentary film Travelin’ Band: Creedence Clearwater Revival at the Royal Albert Hall, directed by Bob Smeaton. The recordings document the band's first European tour and feature footage that has never been released; the album includes the entire set recorded on April 14, 1970.

Reception
Writing for Variety, Jem Aswad praises both the album and documentary for capturing the band at their peak. John Aizlewood of Classic Rock rates the album four out of five, highlighting all of the individual member's contributions to the band, as well as the "pristine listening experience" due to the technical personnel preparing the recordings for listening. AllMusic's Fred Thomas gave a positive review pointing out the upbeat performances that are "flawlessly executed and crackling with energy".

Track listing
All songs written by John Fogerty, except where noted
"Born on the Bayou" – 5:12
"Green River" – 2:57
"Tombstone Shadow" – 3:39
"Travelin' Band" – 2:11
"Fortunate Son" – 2:16
"Commotion" – 2:45
"Midnight Special" (traditional, arranged by John Fogerty) – 3:38
"Bad Moon Rising" – 2:19
"Proud Mary" – 3:01
"The Night Time Is the Right Time" (Lew Herman) – 3:11
"Good Golly, Miss Molly" (Robert Blackwell and John Marascalco) – 2:51
" Keep On Chooglin'" – 8:37

The Super Deluxe Edition from Craft Recordings also included a second disc that acts as a soundtrack to the film with songs recorded by the band, including in earlier incarnations under different names:
"Come On Baby" (by Tommy Fogerty and The Blue Velvets) – 2:13
"Brown Eyed Girl" (by The Golliwogs) – 2:31
"Porterville" (by The Golliwogs) – 2:17
"Suzie Q." (Eleanor Broadwater, Robert Chaisson, Dale Hawkins, and Stan Lewis) – 4:20
"I Put a Spell on You" (Screamin' Jay Hawkins) – 4:32
"Proud Mary" – 3:07
"Born on the Bayou" – 5:15
"Bad Moon Rising" – 2:19
"Green River" – 2:34
"The Night Time Is the Right Time" (Lew Herman) – 3:07
"Down on the Corner" – 2:46
"Who'll Stop the Rain" – 2:27

Personnel
Creedence Clearwater Revival
Doug Clifford – drums
Stu Cook – bass guitar, backing vocals
John Fogerty – vocals, guitar, harmonica
Tom Fogerty – rhythm guitar, backing vocals

Technical personnel
Giles Martin – mixing, restoration
Sam Okell – mixing, restoration
Miles Showell – mastering at Abbey Road Studios

Charts

See also
List of 2022 albums

References

External links
Press release from Craft Recordings

Travelin' Band: Creedence Clearwater Revival at the Royal Albert Hall at Netflix
Review from Spill Magazine
Reviews of the film from Rotten Tomatoes

2022 live albums
Creedence Clearwater Revival live albums
Craft Recordings live albums
Fantasy Records live albums
Live albums recorded at the Royal Albert Hall